The Santuario de la Cueva Santa, also called la cueva del Latonero, is a Roman Catholic cave-chapel in Altura, Spain. It was made into a chapel by shepherds.

References

Caves of Spain
Landforms of the Valencian Community